Cinderella is a 2021 Indian Tamil-language horror film written and directed by Vinoo Venketesh on his directorial debut under the banner SSi Productions. The film stars Raai Laxmi in the title role, with Sakshi Agarwal also in lead role, Anbu Thasan in the supporting role, with Aswamithra composing the music. Principal photography of the film commenced in October 2018. The film was released on 24 September 2021. The film received mixed to positive reviews, but declared as a flop.

Plot 

Akira (Raai Laxmi) a sound designer is arrested as a suspect, but she claims she is innocent. She has come to a hill station to record the sounds of a few rare birds for a Hollywood project. She finds a Cinderella costume in an antique shop and brings it home and has paranormal experiences. Meanwhile, Ramya (Sakshi Agarwal), a rich girl is killed and her mother becomes the next target of a ghost. 
At the police station, a man is arrested for assaulting Sandra, Ramya's mother. When leaving the station Akira bumps into Sandra, who is shocked to see her. She contacts her manager requesting for an appointment with Saint Gonzalves. The movie then jumps to a flashback.
Thulasi, a look alike of Akira works as a maid for Sandra and Ramya, who berates her. She once sees a Cinderella costume and saves money to buy it. Meanwhile, Ramya falls in love with her dance choreographer, Robin. Robin, on a visit to Ramya's House, sees Thulasi dancing and admires her. Later during Ramya's birthday party, Thulasi wears the Cinderella costume and Robin falls for her. He later proposes her, angering Ramya. Later that day, Ramya and Sandra kill Thulasi. Thulasi's spirit goes into the gown, and a possessed Akira kills Ramya. Sandra, with the help of the Saint, tries to ward off the ghost. But Thulasi, pairs up with another woman's ghost, a lady killed by her husband and Sandra and kills Sandra.

Cast 
 Raai Laxmi as Thulasi / Akira
 Sakshi Agarwal as Ramya
 Ujjayinee Roy as Ramya's mother
 Robo Shankar as Guru
 Kalloori Vinoth as Bob
 My Dear Bootham Abhilash as Kayamboo
 Mohan Raman as Judge
 Anbu Thasan
 Boys Rajan as Psychiatrist
 Supergood Subramani as a security guard for the boutique
 Gajaraj

Production 
The project was announced by debutant Vinoo Venketesh who previously worked as an associate director of S. J. Surya. The filming progressed from October 2018 according to notable sources. After narrating the script to Nayanthara, Trisha, Amy Jackson, Hansika Motwani, Aishwarya Rajesh, Manisha Yadav, Anjali and Regina Cassandra, Raai Laxmi, who was a parts of horror thriller horror films like Aranmanai and Kanchana was cast in the female lead. As per Raai, she has three different characterisations in the film. Sakshi Agarwal was announced as a second female lead.

Release 
The film was released on 24 September 2021.

Critical reception 
Cinderella received mixed reviews. Though the critics praised the editing and jump scares, the screenplay and plot were criticized. In his largely negative review for Critic Rants, Gordon McIntyre wrote that he loved the movie for its stereotypical treatment but hated it for the same reasons.

References

External links 
 

2020s Tamil-language films
2021 films
Films shot in Chennai
Films shot in Ooty
Indian fantasy films
Indian horror thriller films